Lily Lake is a small alpine lake in Custer County, Idaho, United States, located in the Sawtooth Mountains in the Sawtooth National Recreation Area.  The lake is just upstream of Redfish Lake and is named from the many water lilies that cover its surface.  There is a trail leading from the southwest end of Redfish Lake to Lily Lake.

Lily Lake is in the Sawtooth Wilderness, and a wilderness permit can be obtained at a registration box at trailheads or wilderness boundaries.

References

See also
 List of lakes of the Sawtooth Mountains (Idaho)
 Sawtooth National Forest
 Sawtooth National Recreation Area
 Sawtooth Range (Idaho)

Lakes of Idaho
Lakes of Custer County, Idaho
Glacial lakes of the United States
Glacial lakes of the Sawtooth Wilderness